The name Rothorn (German for Red Peak) is a common name for summits in the Alps. It may refer to:

Austria
In Carinthia
Rothorn (2621 m) in the Kreuzeck group
In Salzburg
Rothorn (2522 m) in the Niedere Tauern
In Tyrol
Großer Rothorn (2403 m) in the Loferer Steinberge
Rothornspitze (2393 m) in the Allgäu Alps
In Vorarlberg
Formarin Rothorn (2481 m) in the Lechquellen Range near the Rote Wand
Rothorn (2239 m) in the Lechquellen Range

Switzerland

In Graubünden Rhaetian Alps:
Radüner Rothorn (3022 m) in the Albula Alps
Aroser Rothorn (2980 m) highest peak of the Plessur Range
Parpaner Rothorn (2861 m) east of Lenzerheide in the Plessur Range
Furna Rothorn (2362 m) in the Plessur Range

Bernese Alps:
Finsteraarrothorn (3530 m) SE of the Finsteraarhorn (Valais)
Oberaarrothorn  (3463 m) east of the Finsteraarhorn (Bern/Valais)
Ferdenrothorn (3180 m) near the Lötschen Pass (Valais)
Faldum Rothorn (2832 m) south of Ferdenrothorn (Valais)
Diemtigtaler Rothorn (2405 m) east of Zweisimmen
Sigriswiler Rothorn (2046 m) above Lake Thun

Emmental Alps:
Brienzer Rothorn (2350 m), on the border of the cantons of Bern, Lucerne and Obwalden

Lepontine Alps:
Rothorn/Punta della Rossa (2888 m) (Valais /Piedmont)
Rothorn (2808 m) above the Steinujoch (Valais)

Pennine Alps:
Zinalrothorn (4221 m) (Valais)
Inner Rothorn (3455) and Äusser Rothorn (3147 m) above Saas Balen in the Fletschhorn massif (Valais)
Oberrothorn (3415 m) and Unterrothorn (3103 m), near Zermatt (Valais)
Rothorn (3277 m) north of the Barrhorn (Valais)
Monte Rothorn (3152 m) south of Castor (Aosta Valley, Italy)

Uri Alps:
Rothorn (OW)  (2526 m) soars above Gental (BE), Melchsee-Frutt (OW) and Mägisalp (BE)